The Best FIFA Football Awards 2019 were held on 23 September 2019 at the Teatro alla Scala in Milan, Italy. The ceremony was attended by some of the most well known former players and managers such as Marco Van Basten, Marcel Desailly, Gianlucca Zambrotta, Fabio Capello, Christian Karembeu, Nadine Keßler, Carles Puyol, and others. Two awards were given out for the first time ever.

Winners and nominees

The Best FIFA Men's Player

Ten players were shortlisted on 31 July 2019. The three finalists were revealed on 2 September 2019.

Lionel Messi won the award with 46 rank points.

The selection criteria for the men's players of the year was: respective achievements during the period from 16 July 2018 to 19 July 2019.

The Best FIFA Men's Goalkeeper

The three finalists were announced on 2 September 2019.

Alisson won the award.

The Best FIFA Men's Coach

Ten coaches were initially shortlisted on 31 July 2019. The three finalists were announced on 2 September 2019.

Jürgen Klopp won the award with 48 rank points.

The Best FIFA Women's Player

Twelve players were shortlisted on 31 July 2019. The three finalists were revealed on 2 September 2019.

Megan Rapinoe won the award with 46 rank points.

The selection criteria for the women's players of the year was: respective achievements during the period from 25 May 2018 to 7 July 2019.

The Best FIFA Women's Goalkeeper

The three finalists were announced on 2 September 2019.

Sari van Veenendaal won the award.

The Best FIFA Women's Coach

Ten coaches were initially shortlisted on 31 July 2019. The three finalists were announced on 2 September 2019.

Jill Ellis won the award with 48 rank points.

FIFA Fair Play Award

FIFA Puskás Award
 
Dániel Zsóri won the award. The ten players shortlisted for the awards were announced on 19 August 2019. The three finalists were announced on 2 September 2019. All goals up for consideration were scored from 16 July 2018 to 19 July 2019. Every registered FIFA.com user was allowed to participate in the final vote until 1 September 2019, with the questionnaire being presented on the official website of FIFA. The top three goals from the vote were then voted on by a panel of ten "FIFA experts", who chose the winner.

FIFA Fan Award

The award celebrates the best fan moments or gestures of September 2018 to September 2019, regardless of championship, gender or nationality. The shortlist was compiled by a panel of FIFA experts, and every registered FIFA.com user was allowed to participate in the final vote until 23 September 2019.

The three nominees were announced on 2 September 2019.

Silvia Grecco won the award with 58% of the vote.

FIFA FIFPro Men's World11

The 55–player men's shortlist was announced on 5 September 2019.

The players chosen were Alisson as goalkeeper, Matthijs de Ligt, Marcelo, Sergio Ramos and Virgil van Dijk as defenders, Frenkie de Jong, Eden Hazard and Luka Modrić as midfielders, and Cristiano Ronaldo, Kylian Mbappé and Lionel Messi as forwards.

 Ranking of other nominees

FIFA FIFPro Women's World11

FIFA and FIFPro announced that they would jointly reveal the Women's World11 for the first time at The Best award ceremony.

The 55–player women's shortlist was announced on 4 September 2019.

The players chosen were Sari van Veenendaal as goalkeeper, Lucy Bronze, Nilla Fischer, Kelley O'Hara and Wendie Renard as defenders, Julie Ertz, Amandine Henry and Rose Lavelle as midfielders, and Marta, Alex Morgan and Megan Rapinoe as forwards.

 Ranking of other nominees

Selection panels

Men's selection panel
The panel of experts who shortlisted the nominees for The Best FIFA Football Awards 2019 for the men's players and coaches comprised:

  Franco Baresi
  Cha Bum-kun
  Fabio Capello
  Ricki Herbert
  Kaká
  Lothar Matthäus
  Francisco Maturana
  Hugo Sánchez
  Juan Sebastián Verón
  Xavi

Women's selection panel
The panel of experts who shortlisted the nominees for The Best FIFA Football Awards 2019 for the women's players and coaches comprised:

  Rae Dower
  Nadine Keßler
  Kristine Lilly
  Portia Modise
  Aline Pellegrino
  Aya Miyama
  Thuba Sibanda
  Kelly Smith
  Rhian Wilkinson
  Kirsty Yallop

Puskás Award panel
The panel of experts who decided the winner of the FIFA Puskás Award comprised:

  Ann Kristin Aarønes
  Brandi Chastain
  Han Duan
  Julie Fleeting
  Miroslav Klose
  Michael Owen
  Patrizia Panico
  Ronaldo
  Yaya Touré
  Christian Vieri

References

External links

 Official website

2019
2019 in association football
2019 sports awards
2019 in women's association football
Women's association football trophies and awards